Joe Cowley is a columnist writer for the Chicago Sun-Times. Cowley, a graduate of Kent State University, served the same role for the Sun-Times sister publication, the Tinley Park, Illinois Daily Southtown, for several years before being hired by the downtown paper before the 2006 season.

Cowley was one of the regular beat writers covering the White Sox during their 2005 World Series championship.

Controversies

In May 2004 while traveling with the White Sox on a road trip to Toronto, Cowley made disparaging remarks about the city of Toronto in a radio interview, calling it “nothing but a city in a third-world country." Subsequently during the series in Toronto, Cowley refused to stand for the Canadian national anthem prior to a game. Toronto Blue Jays president Paul Godfrey described Cowley as having “bad manners” and had letters of complaint sent to both Cowley and his publisher over the incident. 

Cowley gained notoriety nationally when he admitted on November 21, 2006 on the Mike and the Mad Dog show, which is heard on WFAN New York, to be the only writer to vote Derek Jeter in sixth place on the American League MVP ballot. However, if Cowley had placed Jeter first on the ballot, Justin Morneau still would have won.

That was the second such incident for Cowley; after omitting Blue Jays players Carlos Delgado and Vernon Wells, two top-ten overall finishers, from his 2003 AL MVP ballot, the Chicago chapter suspended him from voting the subsequent year. They accused Cowley of not voting seriously, saying he "embarrassed" the Chicago chapter of the BBWAA. 

In November 2009, a Chicago White Sox fan blog posted a report that their sources had said the White Sox were having preliminarily discussions to acquire Adrián González from the San Diego Padres in a three-way deal. Cowley called the blogger a "trekkie turned blogger" who wrote from his basement. Cowley occasionally mocks SoxNet.net on Twitter and on the radio from time to time. Cowley's initial mocking prompted a response from the SoxNet.net blog calling his attacks "unprofessional, offensive, and completely inappropriate". Cowley replied, but SoxNet.net opted not post his reply, calling Cowley's initial attack "mature" compared to his response.

On April 29, 2012, Cowley posted a series of controversial comments about female sportswriter Jessica Daniels on his Twitter account before subsequently deleting his account.

Joe Cowley was the only voter to not have Ja Morant as the winner of the NBA Rookie of the year for the 2019-20 season. He instead voted for Zion Williamson, who played 24 games that season.

References

External links

Cowley on Mike and the Mad Dog show - mp3 file

Sportswriters from Illinois
Chicago Sun-Times people
Kent State University alumni
Living people
Year of birth missing (living people)